O Beijo do Escorpião (English: The Kiss of the Scorpion) is a Portuguese telenovela broadcast and produced by TVI. It was written by António Barreira, author of some of the biggest hits of the channel, and by João Matos. The telenovela premiered on 2 February 2014 and its last episode aired on 4 October 2014, totaling a number of 194 episodes. It was broadcast in the primetime slot at 9pm (UTC). The telenovela was recorded in Lisbon, Portugal.

Plot
Two women find out they are sisters in the worst possible way and, from that moment on, engage in a constant conflict.

Alice (Sara Matos) wants Ritas  life. Rita (Dalila Carmo) wants to bring Alice into the happy family life she built with her husband Fernando (Pedro Lima), unaware that her sister is truly an evil monster who will stop at nothing to take Ritas place. In the cosmopolitan and sophisticated city of Lisbon, we watch as the stories of common people intersect, as they face everyday tribulations, fighting and trying to overcome them, in a plot filled with emotion and sensuality, in which evil is depicted in all its rawness and in which we see how that evil can ruin those who aren’t ready to face their enemies, no matter where they come from... And, sometimes, your worst enemy is yourself or those to whom you call your family...

Cast

Main
 Sara Matos – Alice Vidal
 Dalila Carmo – Rita Macieira
 Pedro Lima – Fernando Macieira
 Pedro Teixeira – Rafael Pires – «Rafa»

Secondary
 Natália Luiza – Adelaide Maria Correia Vidal
 Nuno Homem de Sá – António Furtado
 Ana Brito e Cunha – Alexandra Furtado – «Xana»
 Marco Delgado – Romão Valente de Albuquerque
 Sandra Faleiro – Natália de Albuquerque
 Maria José Paschoal – Conceição Pires
 Joana Seixas – Teresa Furtado
 Rui Luís Brás – Marco Santos
 Sofia Nicholson – Ana Santos
 Paula Neves – Vera Ramos
 Rodrigo Menezes – Nuno Ramos
 Dinarte Branco – Hilário Castelo
 Pedro Carvalho – Paulo Furtado from Macieira
 Patricia André – Isabel de Albuquerque – «Becas»
 Renato Godinho – Manuel Ventura
 Duarte Gomes – Miguel Macieira
 Madalena Brandão – Marta Ventura
 Isaac Alfaiate – Ricardo de Albuquerque
 Joana Câncio – Tina Castelo
 Rodrigo Paganelli – André Macieira
 Mikaela Lupu – Maria Santos
 Gonçalo Sá – Frederico Santos
 Mafalda Tavares – Carlota Furtado
 Luís Ganito – Duarte Macieira
 Nicolau Breyner – Henrique de Albuquerque
 Lídia Franco – Madalena de Albuquerque
 Margarida Marinho – Rosalinda Castelo
 Diogo Infante – Afonso Gonçalves

Children
 Daniela Marques – Beatriz Ventura
 Francisco Magalhães – Martim Ramos

References

Portuguese telenovelas
Televisão Independente telenovelas
2014 Portuguese television series debuts
2014 Portuguese television series endings
2014 telenovelas
Portuguese-language telenovelas